Three Million African Genomes (3MAG) is a human genetics project inaugurated by Ambroise Wonkam of Cape Town University in South Africa. The project's aim is to correct for the systemic shortfall in the collection and analysis of genomic data of Africans, who have the widest genetic variation among human populations, via sequencing to capture "the full scope of variation to improve health care, equity and medical research globally". Three million is the initial rough estimate of the sample size required to capture the variation.

See also

References

Biobank organizations
Genetics databases
Organisations based in South Africa
Science and technology in Africa
2021 establishments in South Africa
Medical and health organizations based in Africa